The 2013–14 Palestine Cup was the 2013–14 edition of the Palestine Cup. The cup winner qualified for the 2015 AFC Cup.

Round of 32

Round of 16

Quarter-finals

Semi-finals

Final

References

External links
Palestine Football Association

Palestine Cup
Palestine
Cup